Dance Dance Revolution Extreme 2 is the tenth home version of Dance Dance Revolution to be released in the United States. It was released by Konami on September 27, 2005 for the PlayStation 2 video game console. It was announced in a press release by Konami on May 17, 2005, and unveiled at the E3 expo in Los Angeles that same day.

Gameplay

Features

The game includes 74 songs, 50 of which are unlocked through normal play or through points earned in Dance Master Mode. The majority of the songs are Konami originals composed by Naoki Maeda. Extreme 2 is the first PlayStation DDR game to include online multiplayer.

Music
Dance Dance Revolution Extreme 2 features a total of 74 songs. All songs feature unique videos designed for this game, except for "Get Busy" by Sean Paul, which features a shorter version of its official music video. Many songs from Extreme 2 appear in subsequent Dance Dance Revolution releases, and their Extreme 2 videos are preserved in these releases.
|-

 1998
 Absolute (Cuff -N- Stuff it Mix)
 Afronova (from Nonstop Megamix)
 Afronova Primeval
 Against All Odds (Take a Look at Me Now)
 Air
 As The Rush Comes
 Be Lovin
 Block Rockin' Beats
 Boom Boom Dollar (K.O.G G3 Mix)
 Brilliant 2U
 Brilliant 2U (K.O.G G3 MIX)
 Burnin' the Floor
 Burnin' the Floor (Blue Fire mix)
 Butterfly (Upswing Mix)
 Can Be Real
 Candy♥
 Cartoon Heroes (Speedy Mix)
 Colors ~for Extreme~
 Crazy In Love
 
 Dive
 Dynamite Rave
 Dynamite Rave (B4 Za Beat Mix)
 Genie in a Bottle
 Get Busy

 Happy Wedding
 Heaven is a '57 metallic gray ~gimmix~
 I Need You (Insideout Door Mix)
 Infinite Prayer
 Injection of Love (Hina Mix)
 Insertion (Machine Gun Kelly Mix) §
 Inside Your Heart
 In the Heat of the Night
 Irrésistiblement
 I Will Survive
 Keep On Movin' ~DMX Mix~
 La Bamba
 La Copa de La Vida
 L'amour et la liberté (DDR version)
 Look at Us (Daddy DJ Remix)
 Look To The Sky (Trance Mix)
 Look To The Sky (True Color Mix)
 Love is Orange
 Make A Difference
 Maria (I Believe)
 Miracle Moon ~L.E.D.Light Style Mix~
 My My My
 Oops!... I Did It Again
 Paranoia
 Paranoia Survivor
 Paranoia Survivor Max

 Passion of Love
 Play That Funky Music
 Polovtsian Dances And Chorus
 Pump Up The Volume
 Quickening
 
 
 Saturday Night Love
 Seduction
 Sexy Planet
 Sexy Planet (from Nonstop Megamix)
 Silence (Airscape Remix)
 Speed Over Beethoven
 Spin Spin Sugar (Armand's Dark Garage Mix)
 Sweet Sweet Love Magic
 Sync (EXTREME version)
 Tomorrow
 Twin Bee ~Generation X~
 Un Deux Trois
 Wonderful Night (radio edit)
 You gotta move it (feat. Julie Rugaard)

§ This song is unrelated to the mainstream rapper Machine Gun Kelly.

The official music video for Block Rockin' Beats appears in Dancing Stage Unleashed 3.

Reception

References

External links
DDR EXTREME 2 Official Homepage at Konami America
DDR STR!KE Official Homepage at Konami Japan

2005 video games
Dance Dance Revolution games
EyeToy games
Multiplayer online games
PlayStation 2-only games
Video games scored by Yuzo Koshiro
Video games developed in the United States
Multiplayer and single-player video games
Konami games
PlayStation 2 games